The 1892 United States elections was held on November 8, electing member to the 53rd United States Congress, taking place during the Third Party System. Democrats retained the House and won control of the Presidency and the Senate. Following the election, Democrats controlled the Presidency and a majority in both chambers of Congress for the first time since the 1858 elections.

In the Presidential election, Republican President Benjamin Harrison was defeated by former Democratic President Grover Cleveland. Cleveland won the popular vote by a margin of three percent, but won by a large margin in the electoral college. Populist James B. Weaver also carried five Western states and won a little over eight percent of the vote. At the 1892 Republican National Convention, Harrison fended off a challenge from supporters of former Secretary of State James G. Blaine and Governor William McKinley of Ohio. At the 1892 Democratic National Convention, Cleveland defeated Senator David B. Hill from New York and Governor Horace Boies of Iowa on the first ballot. Harrison had previously defeated Cleveland in 1888, and Cleveland's win made him the first President to serve non-consecutive terms. Cleveland's win in the popular vote also made him the second person, after Andrew Jackson, to win the popular vote in three presidential elections.

Reapportionment following the 1890 census added twenty four seats to the House. Republicans picked up several seats in the House, but Democrats continued to command a large majority in the chamber.

In the Senate, Democrats made moderate gains to win a majority (including the Democratic Vice President) in the chamber for the first time since the 1880 elections.

See also
1892 United States presidential election
1892 United States House of Representatives elections
1892–93 United States Senate elections

References

Further reading 
 
 
 
 
 
 
 
 Nevins, Allan. Grover Cleveland: A Study in Courage (1932) Pulitzer Prize-winning biography, the major resource on Cleveland.
 Oberholtzer, Ellis Paxson. A History of the United States since the Civil War. Volume V, 1888–1901 (1937). pp 169–244
 

1892 elections in the United States
1892